Westlock—St. Paul (briefly known as Battle River) was a federal electoral district in Alberta, Canada, that was represented in the House of Commons of Canada from 2004 to 2015. It included Westlock County, Sturgeon County, Thorhild County, Smoky Lake County, the County of St. Paul No. 19 and the Municipal District of Bonnyville No. 87. Following the Canadian federal electoral redistribution, 2012 this riding was abolished into Lakeland (35%), Sturgeon River—Parkland (32%), Fort McMurray—Cold Lake (20%), Peace River—Westlock (13%) and a small section outside of St. Albert being transferred to St. Albert—Edmonton.

History
This riding was created in 2003 as "Westlock—St. Paul" from parts of Lakeland, Elk Island, St. Albert, Yellowhead and Athabasca ridings. The riding was known as "Battle River" from 2004 to 2005, despite the Battle River not actually running through the riding.

Members of Parliament

Election results

See also
 List of Canadian federal electoral districts
 Past Canadian electoral districts

References

Notes

External links
 
 
 
 Expenditures - 2008
 Expenditures - 2004
 Website of the Parliament of Canada
 

Former federal electoral districts of Alberta
Cold Lake, Alberta
County of St. Paul No. 19
Westlock County